Raúl Chabrand Manrique (born 11 August 1976, in El Mante, Tamaulipas), known as Raúl Chabrand, is a Mexican former professional footballer and current manager of the Mexico national under-17 team.

Personal life
Chabrand is of Lebanese descent.

External links
 

1976 births
Living people
Sportspeople from Tamaulipas
Mexican footballers
Mexican people of Lebanese descent
Irapuato F.C. footballers
Liga MX players
Mexican football managers
Club Tijuana managers
Association football defenders
Sportspeople of Lebanese descent